The Diplomatic Security Service (DSS or DS) is the principal security and law enforcement agency of the United States Department of State. As the operational division of State Department's Bureau of Diplomatic Security, its primary mission is to protect diplomatic assets, personnel, and information and to combat visa and passport fraud. DSS also undertakes counterterrorism, counterintelligence, cybersecurity and criminal investigations, both domestically and abroad.

Originating from diplomatic security measures enacted during the First World War, DSS was formally established in 1985 following the deadly 1983 bombings of the U.S. embassy and Marine barracks in Beirut, Lebanon. It is the leading U.S. law enforcement agency abroad and the most widely deployed in the world, protecting 275 U.S. diplomatic missions in over 170 countries and 29 U.S. cities. As employees of the U.S. State Department DSS special agents are unique in U.S. federal law enforcement for also being members of the Foreign Service.

DSS' most visible activity is providing security to the U.S. Secretary of State, the U.S. Ambassador to the United Nations and other senior diplomats. As part of its duty to provide a safe and secure environment for U.S. diplomacy, DSS also protects foreign dignitaries, advises U.S. ambassadors on security matters, and manages security programs for international events, often in cooperation with domestic and foreign counterparts.

Overview 
While best known for its security role, DSS is a full-fledged law enforcement agency that conducts international criminal investigations, threat analysis, counterterrorism, counterintelligence, security technology and cybersecurity. The agency employs over 2,000 special agents, sometimes referred to as "DSS Agents" or "DS Agents." These agents are federal agents with the power to arrest, carry firearms, serve arrest warrants and perform other law enforcement activities.

Whereas most U.S. federal law enforcement agents are members of the Federal Civil Service, the majority of DSS special agents are both Foreign Service specialists and law enforcement officers. DSS agents are uniquely required to serve multiple-year tours abroad as a condition of employment. When not on an overseas assignment, agents serve at DSS headquarters in Arlington, Virginia, or in one of the 29 field offices nationwide. A small percentage of DSS special agents are members of the State Department's Civil Service and are not mandated to serve tours overseas; they instead focus on criminal investigations and dignitary protection within the United States.

When assigned to domestic field offices, DSS special agents investigate passport fraud and visa fraud, and protect visiting foreign dignitaries. They also investigate the activities of foreign intelligence agencies that are focused on the Department of State, assist in apprehending fugitives that have fled the United States, and conduct background checks on State Department employees, applicants and contractors.

When assigned to U.S. embassies and consulates abroad, DSS special agents perform law enforcement duties at U.S. missions, provide security assistance, protect senior diplomats and perform other roles as needed. The ranking DSS Special Agent at an embassy or consulate holds the title Regional Security Officer (RSO) and is often known as the 'security attaché'.

History
The origins of DSS go back to the early stages of the First World War, when the United States, which sought to maintain its neutrality, found itself the target of espionage, sabotage and passport fraud. German and Austrian spies were known to be conducting operations in New York City using forged or stolen identity papers. In late 1915, Secretary of State Robert Lansing recommended creating an international law enforcement task force within the Department of State to investigate such crimes.

Bureau of Secret Intelligence 

When his suggestion failed to gain support, on April 4, 1916, Secretary Lansing, with the authorization of President Woodrow Wilson, created his own task force, the Bureau of Secret Intelligence, which he dubbed "the Secret Service of the Department of State." An off-the-books adjunct to the Division of Information, the Bureau was also known as the Office of the Chief Special Agent, possibly to disguise its sensitive operations.

Supported by confidential funds from Secretary Lansing's office, this small force was composed of agents from the U.S. Secret Service, who specialized in counterfeit currency, and agents of the U.S. Postal Inspection Service (USPIS), which had the best forensic laboratory in the country. The agents were overseen by a junior Foreign Service Officer, Leland Harrison. Tasked primarily with counterespionage and counterintelligence, the team also investigated passport fraud, protected U.S. and foreign diplomats on U.S. soil, and processed threat reports from overseas posts. Following U.S. entry into the war, the Bureau also interned and exchanged diplomatic officials of enemy powers.

After the war ended, Congress passed laws requiring American citizens to return with passports and resident aliens to enter with visas. State Department agents began investigating subsequent instances of passport and visa fraud. Around this same time State Department agents began protecting distinguished visitors to the United States. By the 1920s, the Chief Special Agent no longer reported his office's activities directly to the Secretary of State, instead answering to the Assistant Secretary of State for Administration. Within the next two decades major passport fraud activities were detected and neutralized worldwide, often involving both Communists and Nazis.

Office of Security 
During World War II, State Department agents were once again involved in interning and exchanging diplomatic officials of enemy powers. Around this time, the Chief Special Agent's office became known as SY (short for Office of Security), which in turn was under the Administration Bureau of the Management Undersecretary. After World War II, SY began expanding its presence overseas, with numerous Regional Security Officer (RSO) positions created in overseas posts.

In 1961, Otto Otepka, then a deputy director of SY, brought to the attention of the U.S. Senate Internal Security Subcommittee deficiencies in the State Department clearance process. The allegations were traced all the way up to then Secretary of State Dean Rusk. Despite multiple awards, appeals from multiple U.S. Senators and not backing down, Secretary Rusk removed Otepka from his position and ultimately unceremoniously fired him.

Starting sometime after World War II, SY began regularly protecting visiting heads of state, but it had done so sporadically since the 1930s. Before his departure in 1947, SY Director Bannerman began codifying procedures for overseas security. This process continued in the late 1940s, with a number of RSO positions being created. From that time and through the early 1970s, the number of agents remained relatively small, hovering around 300, with more than half of these serving overseas at any given time. The April 1983 U.S. Embassy bombing was a catharsis for the State Department, which would transform SY into the newly created Diplomatic Security Service, part of the Bureau of Diplomatic Security.

Diplomatic Security Service 
Congress formed a commission headed by Admiral Bobby Ray Inman to look into the bombings of U.S. diplomatic facilities in Beirut. The resultant Inman Report recommended that security at the State Department needed to be elevated to a higher priority. In 1985, Congress created the Bureau of Diplomatic Security (DS), headed by the Assistant Secretary of State for Diplomatic Security, and the Diplomatic Security Service (DSS), headed by the Director of DSS, who is subordinate to the Assistant Secretary of State for DS. However, DSS is the federal law enforcement agency, and not the Bureau of Diplomatic Security (DS).

The Director of DSS is an active DSS agent and is often referred as the Principal Deputy Assistant Secretary (PDAS), as he/she is senior to the various assistant directors of Diplomatic Security who hold positions equivalent to Deputy Assistant Secretary (DAS). The PDAS designation signifies the DSS director's preeminence over the other DASs within DSS, while at the same time signifying his/her position under the Assistant Secretary of State for Diplomatic Security.

The first several Assistant Secretaries for DS were senior Foreign Service Officers, while the last three have been senior law enforcement officers, brought in from other law enforcement agencies. With the creation of DS and DSS, its ranks grew to well over 1,000 agents. However, by the mid-1990s, budget cutbacks were foisted on the U.S. State Department by Congress, and the department in turn trimmed the budget of DSS to the point where it had dwindled to a little over 600 agents.

Although DSS was by then a Bureau within the State Department, the vast majority of RSOs overseas continued to report to the Administration Officer. This changed in 1999, as fallout from the East Africa embassy bombings of 1998. The terse message from the then Undersecretary for Management announcing the immediate change made it clear that this action was against his best judgment and insinuated that it was done because then Secretary of State Madeleine Albright ordered it. This change stripped DSS out from under Administration Officers and placed the RSO directly under the Deputy Chief of Mission (DCM) in the chain of command at an Embassy.

Structure and organization 

Outside the Department of State, there is much confusion about the relationship between the Bureau of Diplomatic Security (DS) and the Diplomatic Security Service (DSS). The DS oversees all security related matters of the Department of State, which includes security at U.S. embassies and consulates. DS has approximately 34,000 employees, of whom roughly 2,400 are U.S. federal agents within DSS. As such, DSS is the primary mechanism by which the Bureau of Diplomatic Security accomplishes its law enforcement (criminal investigative) and security missions.

The Bureau of Diplomatic Security is headed by the Assistant Secretary of State for Diplomatic Security, who in turn is served by several Deputy Assistant Secretaries (DAS). The Principal Deputy Assistant Secretary (PDAS) is the Director for the Diplomatic Security Service (DSS) and is always an active DSS Special Agent.All employees who work for Bureau of Diplomatic Security, including those of DSS, are referred to as DS employees. This usage sometimes appears in DOS press releases, although recently multi-agency press releases from the Department of Justice distinguish between DSS and its umbrella organization. Additionally, DSS special agents are frequently assigned to positions within DS but outside of the DSS chain of command hierarchy. For example, while assigned overseas, Department of State employees are evaluated by their superiors at the embassy or consulate to which they are assigned. In the case of DSS agents, the RSO (senior special agent at post) is rated by the Deputy Chief of Mission and reviewed by the Chief of Mission (Ambassador). The DSS hierarchy has no input on the agent's evaluation, though it does provide instructions to the agent.

Protection mission 

The DSS is best identified with its protection assignments around the globe. The largest permanent dignitary protection detail carried out by DSS agents is on the United States Secretary of State. The Ambassador to the United Nations also has an ongoing protection detail. Some U.S. ambassadors receive protection from DSS in addition to security provided overseas by the host countries, depending on their post.
Currently, the protection detail for the U.S. Ambassador to Iraq is one of the largest in the agency's history.

Protection of visiting Foreign ministers and senior officials from major nations, Heads of States and governments not officially recognized by the U.S, Heads of Major International organizations and high ranking diplomats are typically covered by DSS. Notable protection details include most major members of the British royal family, the Fourteenth Dalai Lama, Palestinian Authority President Mahmoud Abbas, Princess Diana, Yasser Arafat, Tsai Ing-wen and Boris Yeltsin. DSS may also provide protection to high-risk private individuals visiting the U.S, such as prominent foreign dissidents or opposition leaders.

The Bureau of Diplomatic Security's Office of Foreign Missions is responsible for the protection of foreign embassies and consulates on U.S. soil. Since DSS does not have a true uniformed force with police powers, other agencies or local police departments are reimbursed for providing this service; two notable are the Secret Service Uniformed Division in Washington, D.C. and the New York City Police Department. During the annual United Nations General Assembly (UNGA) meeting in September, DSS, as well as the U.S. Secret Service and other federal agencies, protect dozens of foreign dignitaries in New York City.

DSS has the authority to provide protection for foreign heads of state and was the lead agency for this role through the early 1970s. However, an order signed by President Richard Nixon gave primary responsibility of protection of visiting heads of state to the Secret Service. Nevertheless, the DSS has expanded its protection mission, including providing security to the heads of Afghanistan, Haiti and Liberia in their respective home countries.

The appointment of Hillary Clinton as Secretary of State raised questions about whether DSS would serve its usual protective role, since, as a former First Lady, she received Secret Service protection. The DSS was ultimately named as the lead agency to carry out the protection for Hillary Clinton during her tenure as Secretary of State.

Investigations 
DSS investigations, carried out by numerous Field Offices and Resident Agent offices throughout the U.S, and by RSOs overseas, focus mainly on passport or visa fraud. DSS Special Agents also investigate such cases as human and sex trafficking, document fraud, international parental kidnapping, violations of the Protect Act, assaults on federally protected persons, fugitive arrests overseas (with host nation assistance), counterterrorism and counterintelligence (CI) investigations and international organized crime cases. If there is a nexus to passport and/or visa fraud, use of State Department documents, diplomatic activities, the U.S. Foreign Service, or terrorism, DSS is typically involved.

Passport and visa fraud 

U.S. passports and visas are valuable travel documents, and consequently some foreign nationals fraudulently acquire U.S. passports and visas to carry out criminal activities, including terrorism, inside the borders of the United States. It is a federal offense to apply, or assist someone in applying, for a U.S. passport or visa when they are not entitled to one. Usually this means an alien in the U.S. trying to establish a false U.S. identity, or stealing the identity from an American, often one who has died. Visa fraud can also include participating in sham marriages in order to allow an unentitled foreigner to become a U.S. citizen.

Sometimes Americans, including Foreign Service Officers (FSOs), are the target of DSS investigations, such as an FSO selling visas for personal gain. DSS also investigates other alleged improper or illegal behavior by Department of State personnel, to include incidents of espionage. Such cases would involve other agencies, such as the Department of Justice. Overseas DSS must take the role of local and state law enforcement when investigating issues such as spousal or child abuse by U.S. government personnel assigned to the embassy. This is because the host country will not investigate or prosecute diplomats, who are considered to have immunity from their laws. DSS also conducts tens of thousands of background investigations per year – not just for the Department of State, but for other federal agencies as well.

In recent years, DSS has expanded its overseas investigations program with ARSO-I's (Assistant Regional Security Officer-Investigators), also known as "Overseas Criminal Investigators." These agents are given special training in consular functions and are commissioned consular officers. However, they spend a large amount of their time working with the fraud units in consular sections, investigating visa and passport fraud, as well as crimes that have a nexus to those documents, including terrorism, organized crime, trafficking in persons, and narcotics violations. The ARSO-I's may work alien smuggling and human trafficking investigations alongside resident or regional ICE- Homeland Security Investigations (HSI) Special Agents. Attaché who typically has jurisdictional primacy in these arenas. At the U.S. border, ARSO-I's may work alien smuggling, human trafficking, and passport and visa fraud cases with U.S. Customs and Border Protection (CBP) and HSI. In addition, ARSO-I's also have responsibilities outside of their respective Consular assignments for mission security.

Counterintelligence 
The Diplomatic Security Service Office of Investigations and Counterintelligence (DS/ICI/CI) conducts a robust counterintelligence program designed to deter, detect, and neutralize the efforts of foreign intelligence services targeting Department of State personnel, facilities, and diplomatic missions worldwide.

The office's counterintelligence division conducts aggressive counterintelligence inquires and counterespionage investigations with other U.S. government agencies. Counterespionage investigations are conducted in coordination with the FBI in accordance with their legal mandates.

The division conducts numerous counterintelligence and security awareness training programs for all U.S. Government personnel requesting or having access to sensitive Department of State facilities and information. All training programs enhance the understanding of both foreign intelligence and espionage threats and countermeasures, and educate employees on the foreign intelligence environment.

In addition, the office relies on a cadre of security engineers to deter, detect, and neutralize attempts by foreign intelligence services to technically penetrate U.S. office buildings and residences. These efforts range from detecting a simple listening device in the wall to countering the most sophisticated electronic eavesdropping devices and systems.

On June 4, 2009, DSS and the FBI arrested former Department of State employee Walter Kendall Myers on charges of serving as an illegal agent of the Cuban government for nearly 30 years and conspiring to provide classified U.S. information to the Cuban government. Myers’ arrest is the culmination of a three-year joint DSS/FBI investigation.

Counterterrorism 
The Diplomatic Security Service maintains agents in dozens of Joint Terrorism Task Force operations around the country. The Office of Protective Intelligence and Investigations (PII) in the Threat Intelligence and Analysis division has DSS Special Agents who travel all over the world investigating threats to the Secretary of State and U.S. Embassies and Consulates. Any time there is a threat or an attack against a U.S. Embassy or Consulate, DSS Special Agents are the first on the scene to investigate.

The Rewards for Justice Program (RFJ) is the counterterrorism rewards program of DSS. The Secretary of State is currently offering rewards for information that prevents or favorably resolves acts of international terrorism against U.S. persons or property worldwide.

In the days following the April 15, 2013 Boston Marathon Bombing, DSS Special Agents investigated the incident along with personnel from the FBI, HSI, State Police, Boston Police, Cambridge Police, and other law enforcement agencies; this led to the death of one suspect and the capture of the second suspect.

Other investigations 
DSS investigates crimes against State Department personnel and other U.S. Government personnel and families assigned under Chief of Mission authority at a U.S. Embassy or Consulate abroad. DSS Special Agents have investigated thefts, assaults, rapes, and murders, among other charges, around the world. Unlike investigations conducted in the United States by other federal agencies, DSS Agents have to work jointly with their foreign counterparts in often hostile areas of the world.

On January 28, 2009, CIA station chief Andrew Warren in Algiers, Algeria was reportedly under investigation by DSS for having allegedly raped two local Muslim women.

Fugitives 
The Diplomatic Security Service is tasked with tracking and capturing fugitives who have fled U.S. jurisdiction to avoid prosecution. In 2009, it assisted in the resolution of 136 international fugitive cases from around the globe.

In 1995 DSS Special Agents Jeff Riner and Bill Miller, the RSOs assigned to the U.S. Embassy in Pakistan, along with Pakistani police and Inter-Services Intelligence (ISI), arrested Ramzi Yousef, who was wanted in connection with the 1993 World Trade Center bombing in New York City.

Jared Ravin Yaffe ran a child pornography ring between March and September 2008 by paying babysitters to give him access to children. When police took note, Yaffe fled to North Carolina, Germany, Romania or Bulgaria, and finally Brazil. He traveled under his real name with his own passport and was chased by U.S. Marshals. On February 11, 2009, the United States District Court, Southern District of California issued a federal arrest warrant for Yaffe, and on April 11, Yaffe was profiled on the television show America's Most Wanted. Brazilian federal police caught him on May 11, and he was returned to the United States the next day, where he faced 20 counts in San Diego of child sexual assault, kidnapping, production of child pornography, and unlawful flight to avoid prosecution. He initially pled not guilty, and his bail was set at $5 million. A year after his capture, Yaffe pled guilty to several counts and was sentenced to 45 years to life in prison, while a babysitter who had provided a child to him also pled guilty and was sentenced to 15 years to life in prison. DSS Special Agent Terrance Lawrence was involved in returning Yaffe from Brazil.

On September 19, 2009, Special Agents from DSS located Derrick Yancey, a former deputy sheriff from DeKalb County, Georgia, in Punta Gorda, Belize. Yancey was wanted in Georgia for double murder of his wife Linda Yancey and a day laborer.

On November 23, 2009, DSS Special Agents from the U.S. Embassy's Regional Security Office (RSO) worked closely with the U.S. Marshals Service, Guatemalan National Police, and INTERPOL to locate alleged murder suspect 24-year-old Ariel Beau Patrick, who was taken into custody in Guatemala. Ariel Patrick was featured on America's Most Wanted.

America's Most Wanted featured the capture of Robert Snyder in Belize – DSS Special Agent (RSO) Rob Kelty was interviewed by John Walsh.

On April 26, 2010, after failing to check in with pretrial services within two days of his April 21 hearing on his bond status, Andrew Warren 42, was apprehended by a combined team of Norfolk Police Department Fugitive Investigators, DSS Special Agents and U.S. Marshals. Judge Ellen S. Huvelle of the U.S. District Court for the District of Columbia issued a bench warrant for the arrest of the former CIA officer.

On July 30, 2010, special agents from DSS located fugitive George Alvin Viste in Peru. Viste was wanted in Clark County, Washington on seven different criminal charges including the rape of a child, child molestation, and incest. “Diplomatic Security’s Regional Security Office in Lima worked closely with the U.S. Marshals Service and our law enforcement counterparts (INTERPOL) in Peru to locate Viste,” said Jeffrey W. Culver, Director of the Diplomatic Security Service.

On October 8, 2010, DSS agents located Dario Sarimiento Tomas in Pampanga, Philippines. DSS worked with Philippine officials to apprehend Tomas, who was wanted in South Korea on charges that he defrauded an individual there of more than $200,000. Tomas was arrested by law enforcement officials from the Philippine National Bureau of Investigations and National Police. Tomas was assigned to the U.S. Embassy in Seoul as a Customs and Border Protection Officer.

On February 3, 2011, Paul Eischeid, a fugitive and member of the Hells Angels who had eluded U.S. Marshals for nearly eight years, was arrested. The accused murderer was arrested in Buenos Aires. An Interpol Red Notice, as well as investigations by the U.S. Marshals Service and DSS in Argentina led to his capture.

On October 5, 2011, in cooperation with the U.S. Marshals Montana Violent Offender Task Force and Belize Police, DSS arrested Michael Patrick McNulty on a $100,000 warrant issued by the state of Montana.

On November 7, 2012, U.S. Marshals Service (USMS) announces the capture of John Earl Gorham. The U.S. Parole Commission issued an arrest warrant for Gorham on Oct. 17, regarding the subject's original conviction of sodomy, kidnapping and assault with the intent to commit sodomy. Gorham was convicted and sentenced to 35 years on these charges. Gorham was arrested for being drunk in public and for sexually assaulting a 14-year-old female at a Chantilly High School football game. The USMS and task force partners from the Diplomatic Security Service located Gorham at his residence on Church Lane in Bowie, MD. The subject was arrested without incident and turned over to the U.S. District Court in the District of Columbia for prosecution.

On April 20, 2013, in coordination with Nicaraguan authorities, the FBI's Panama City Legal Attaché Office and the Diplomatic Security's Regional Security Office of the U.S. Embassy in Managua located Eric Justin Toth in Esteli, Nicaragua, where he was placed into custody. His arrest was the result of an exhaustive and well coordinated investigation by the FBI's Washington Field Office, the FBI legal attaché, and Special Agents of the Diplomatic Security Service assigned to the U.S. Embassy in Managua.

Overseas mission

Regional Security Officer (RSO) 

The DSS presence overseas is led at each embassy by a DSS Special Agent known as a Regional Security Officer (RSO), who is in charge of a Regional Security Office and serves as the senior law enforcement advisor and security attaché to the U.S. Ambassador.

Like all members of the Foreign Service, DSS agents cannot remain posted in the U.S. for more than six consecutive years and must eventually be assigned to an overseas post. Once assigned overseas, a DSS agent will typically serve first as a Special Agent called an Assistant Regional Security Officer (ARSO) in a Regional Security Office. Agents who enjoy the overseas lifestyle will try to get a second tour in a Special Agent slot at a large embassy, or possibly serve as a Regional Security Officer (RSO) at a small post or as a Deputy Regional Security Officer (DRSO) at a medium-sized post. Usually after two back-to-back overseas tours, agents will be encouraged to return to the U.S. and serve in a headquarters position before returning overseas as a Regional Security Officer.

DSS has been expanding its criminal role overseas and now has many overseas fraud investigator positions. These positions are referred to as “I” positions – as in “Investigator” – and they are commonly referred to as ARSO-Is. These agents work out of the consular sections of embassies and consulates instead of the Regional Security Offices. The performance of these agents is rated by the RSO or the Deputy RSO and is reviewed by the Consul General.

There are several other overseas positions filled by DSS agents. At new building construction sites, agents will serve as the Site Security Manager (SSM) where they will supervise the overall security of the new building including the Construction Security Technicians (CST) and Cleared American Guards (CAG). For construction at posts where there is a critical counterintelligence (CI) threat, agents will also serve as CI investigators dedicated to preventing compromise of the most sensitive spaces within the new embassy.

It is common for domestically assigned DS agents to serve temporary duty (TDY) at Embassies overseas. Such duty can range from various types of protection duties to RSO support or security training for an overseas post, and may last for as little as a few days to multiple months.

DSS agents have often found themselves in harm's way, with four agents and 28 contract security specialists killed in the line of duty as of July 2006. The vast majority of DSS casualties had taken place within the five years in Iraq, where DSS continued to conduct its most critical and dangerous protective missions.

The Regional Security Officer title is currently in an unofficial period of flux and, although not officially sanctioned, some agents posted overseas use derivative titles such as security attaché or only use their agent titles on their business cards. Newer agents generally dislike the title, because it doesn't reflect their law enforcement status, and consider it a vestige of Diplomatic Security's SY days.

According to U.S. law, the title "security officer" is legally defined as someone who is employed by a private entity and is not a law enforcement officer. Additionally, it is noted that RSOs no longer cover multiple countries and are thus not regional. Even some more seasoned agents have taken to referring to themselves as Special Agent-in-Charge/Regional Security Officer on their official biographies.

The method in which the RSO title is implemented also has the potential to create confusion when interacting with outside organizations. It is possible at larger overseas missions with multiple diplomatic facilities located in the same country to have multiple agents with the Regional Security Officer title. India, for example, has an RSO position at the embassy at the Senior Foreign Service level and 4 other RSOs at the consulates at the significantly lower grade 3 level yet all of these agents have the same job title. Sometimes the title Senior Regional Security Officer will be used to help prevent confusion or to indicate that the agent is the most senior in the country.

Overseas Criminal Investigations Division 
The OCI manages all DSS investigative forces abroad, namely Assistant Regional Security Officer-Investigators (ARSO-Is), DSS special agents responsible for ensuring the integrity of the U.S. passport and visa system. Embedded in 120 diplomatic posts across 85 countries, there are roughly 130 ARSO-Is who conduct criminal investigations and work with foreign governments to build a global law enforcement network; they maintain formal partnerships and training programs with foreign police, immigration, and customs officials to target a wide range of criminals, including forgers, smugglers, and terrorists. The division's prevailing goal is to "combat crime where it originates rather than waiting for it to cross U.S. borders."

With its global partners, ARSO-Is help locate and return an average of 300 fugitives to the U.S. annually; missions have included dismantling major human smuggling networks, identifying criminals involved in child exploitation and pornography, ending international scams, and disrupting suspected terrorist travel.

Notable investigations and arrests 
DSS agents have been involved in investigations of most terrorist attacks on U.S. interests overseas in the past twenty years, including the 2000 bombing of the USS Cole, and bombings of two U.S. Embassies in East Africa in 1998. In 1995, DSS Special Agents Jeff Riner and Bill Miller, the RSOs assigned to the U.S. embassy in Pakistan, along with Pakistani police and Inter-Services Intelligence (ISI), arrested Ahmed Ramzi Yousef, who was wanted in connection with the 1993 World Trade Center bombing in New York City; despite FBI press releases, the agency played no role in his capture.

Special event security 
In addition to being posted at U.S. missions around the world, DSS agents have worked closely with their foreign counterparts to secure such events as the 2008 Olympic Games in Beijing, China, the 2007 Pan American Games in Rio de Janeiro, Brazil, 2006 Winter Olympic Games in Turin, Italy; the 2010 Winter Olympics in Vancouver, Canada, 2010 World Cup Football Matches and a host of other special events. While the Olympics are the most well-known events, DSS agents have worked with host country security on numerous other large-scale events around the world. For events with a large U.S. presence, such as the Olympics, an Olympic Security Coordinator – always a DSS agent – will be named to manage all of the security and liaison with the host government. All other federal agencies, such as the FBI, ATF, USSS, and DOD components, will report to the DSS agent in charge.

Hiring process 
The DSS Special Agent hiring process is widely regarded as one of the most difficult and challenging within both the federal government and general law enforcement. Less than 2% of applicants successfully completes and passes the hiring process. Agents Candidates must successfully pass an intensive multi-stage evaluation process that includes a series of written exams, knowledge-based exams, writing samples, panel interviews, and situational judgment exercises; a physical fitness test (PFT); a comprehensive medical examination granting worldwide availability; and an exhaustive background investigation for security clearance at the level of Top Secret/Sensitive Compartmented Information (TS/SCI). A final suitability review and vote by a Foreign Service panel evaluates a candidate's overall ability to represent the interests of the United States abroad.

All DSS special agents have at least a four-year bachelor's degree, and most have graduate and/or post-graduate degrees. Agent candidates must be under the age of 37 at the time of commissioning, unless granted a waiver due to prior military service.

Training 
After a new agent candidate is hired, he or she begins a nearly nine-month training program that includes the Criminal Investigator Training Program (CITP) at the U.S. Department of Homeland Security's Federal Law Enforcement Training Center (FLETC) (pronounced flet-see) in Glynco, Georgia; a Basic Special Agent Course (BSAC) at the Diplomatic Security Training Center, and courses at the Foreign Service Institute (FSI) in Arlington, Virginia. After completion of all initial training, agents are required to pass quarterly re-qualifications on their duty weapons, which include the Glock 19M, Colt Sub Machine Gun, the Mk18 rifle, and Remington 870 shotgun. A new training facility that will consolidate DSS' various training venues is located at FT Pickette VA. A new special agent is usually assigned to a domestic field office for two to three years before taking on an overseas assignment, although an agent can expect to be sent on frequent temporary duty assignments overseas even when assigned to a domestic post. However, agents may be called overseas much earlier depending on the needs of DSS. As members of the Foreign Service, agents are expected to spend most of their career living and working overseas, often in hazardous environments or less developed countries throughout the world.
 Basic Special Agent Course (BSAC) (including FLETC): 6 months
 Basic Regional Security Office Course (RSO School): 3 months
 (ATLaS): 10.5 weeks
 Language Training: 2–12 months per language
 Basic Field Firearms Officer Course (BFFOC): 2 weeks
 High Risk Environment Firearms Course (HREFC): 3 days

Weapons 

When assigned to the United States special agents are authorized to carry firearms both on and off duty and when assigned overseas are authorized to carry firearms when approved by the chief of mission.

Standard issue: 
Glock 19M (9mm pistol – primary)
Glock 26 Gen 4 (9mm pistol – secondary & off-duty)
 Remington 870 (12 gauge shotgun)
 Colt M4 (5.56mm Carbine)

Former weapons included the SIG P228 (9mm pistol), SIG P229 (9mm pistol), Uzi submachine gun, the Ruger Mini-14 carbine, and the Colt SMG (9mm submachine gun). Stockless or "shorty" versions of the Remington 870 shotgun may still be found in some DSS offices. DSS agents were issued the Smith & Wesson Model 19 revolver (.357 Magnum caliber), but switched to 9mm pistols around 1993.

Additional issue:
 Glock 19 (9mm pistol)
 Heckler & Koch MP5 (9mm submachine gun)
 Mk 18 Mod 0 (5.56mm Carbine)
 M249 light machine gun (5.56mm SAW)
 M240 machine gun (7.62mm machine gun)
 M203 grenade launcher (40mm grenade launcher)
 M2 Browning (.50 machine gun)

These and other weapons systems may be employed by DSS Special Agents assigned to high-threat locations. The agents going to those locations attend additional training (HTOC) in these weapons before they are deployed.

Leadership

Bureau of Secret Intelligence directors 
Also known as Office of the Chief Special Agent.
 Robert Lansing (1916), Secretary of State exercising direct control over the Bureau of Secret Intelligence
 Leland Harrison (1916), Special Assistant who reports to the Deputy Secretary of State (Counselor – Frank L. Polk)
 Joseph Nye (1917–1920), first Chief Special Agent
 Robert C. Bannerman (1920–1940), father of future SY Director
 Thomas F. Fitch (1940–1947)

Office of Security directors 
 Robert L. Bannerman (1945–1947), father of third generation SY/DS agent
 Donald Nicholson (1948–1952)
 John Ford (1952–1953)
 Dennis Flinn (1953–1956)
 E. Tomlin Bailey (1956–1958)
 William O. Boswell (1958–1962), father of future DS Assistant Secretary of State Eric J. Boswell
 Otto Otepka, deputy director (1959–1962)
 John Francis Reilly (1962–1963)
 G. Marvin Gentile (1964–1974) former FBI Special Agent and CIA Security Officer
 Viktor Dikeos (1974–1978)
 Karl Ackerman (1978–1982), former SY Special Agent and FBI Special Agent
 Marvin Garrett (1982–1983)
 David C. Fields (1984–1985)
David A. Boling (SY Special Agent and diplomatic officer)

DSS directors 

The Director of the DSS is also the Principal Deputy Assistant Secretary of State for the Bureau of Diplomatic Security, reporting to an Assistant Secretary of State.

Fatalities 
Since the establishment of the Diplomatic Security Service, four Special Agents have died in the line of duty. As of March 2016, a further 133 locally engaged DSS staff, host country law enforcement personnel and members of the US military had been killed while undertaking diplomatic security duties.

In popular culture

Film
 1972: Target: Embassy (film) – Broderick Crawford plays the embassy Regional Security Officer.
 1998: U.S. Marshals – Robert Downey, Jr. plays a rogue DSS agent who is after another DSS agent suspected of murder and treason, portrayed by Wesley Snipes.
 2006: Second in Command – Vlad Ivanov plays DSS special agent John Lydon who is assigned as the RSO at a small embassy.
 2007: A Mighty Heart – DSS Special Agent Randall Bennett leads the team investigating Daniel Pearl's kidnapping and murder.
 2011: Fast Five marks the entry of Dwayne Johnson in The Fast and the Furious film series, playing Diplomatic Security Service special agent Luke Hobbs, who goes on to star in the next 3 sequels. 
 2015: 13 Hours: The Secret Soldiers of Benghazi – DSS agents Dave Ubben, Scott Wickland, and three other agents are depicted as ambassador Chris Stevens's security detail during his visit to the consulate in Benghazi. Later in the film, they help security contractors defend the CIA annex when it comes under attack.
 2015: Survivor - Katherine "Kate" Abbott (played by Milla Jovovich) a DSS/Foreign Service officer is on the run after a terrorist attack and must stop another before it's too late.

Television
 1999: On the Inside (Discovery Channel TV show) – "State Department Protectors" (Knightscenes Productions)
 2000: Investigative Reports (A&E TV show) – "In the Line of Fire" (44 Blue Productions)
 2001: Badges Without Borders (TLC TV show) – "Inside the Diplomatic Security Service" (Red Apple Entertainment Productions)
 2003: Targeted: Volume 1, The Evil Genius (Ramzi Yousef) (Wild Eyes Productions for the History Channel; A&E Networks)
 2004: Heroes Under Fire (History Channel TV show), "Escape from Liberia" (Wild Eyes Productions)
 2005: Heroes Under Fire (History Channel TV show), "Caught in the Middle" (Wild Eyes Productions) – DSS/MSD in Haiti
 2006: Critical Threat: Life in the Bureau of Diplomatic Security (Wild Eyes Productions)
 2006: The Unit Season 2, "Force Majeure" (TV action drama) – the team goes in as DSS special agents to evacuate an exiled dictator from an American hospital during a hurricane.
 2006: "The Path to 9/11" – DSS Special Agents Jeff Riner and Bill Miller, the RSOs assigned to the U.S. embassy in Pakistan, along with Pakistani police and Inter-Services Intelligence (ISI), arrested Ahmed Ramzi Yousef.
 2013: Secrets of Diplomatic Security (Military Channel)

Tabletop role-playing games
 2016: In the horror role-playing game Delta Green, the Diplomatic Security Service is one of the professions available for player characters as part of the United States Department of State. The eponymous organization employ DSS agents due their extensive authority and knowledge in operations in foreign countries.

Books
 1999: The New Jackals: Ramzi Yousef, Osama bin Laden and the Future of Terrorism (book), by Simon Reeve (UK Television presenter)
 2002: Relentless Pursuit: The DSS and the Manhunt for the Al-Qaeda Terrorists (book) by Samuel M. Katz
 2008: Ghost: Confessions of a Counterterrorism Agent – A memoir by former DSS Special Agent Fred Burton in which he chronicles his service in the DSS counterterrorism branch.
2011: History of the Bureau of Diplomatic Security of the United States Department of State (book)
 2012: The Panther (book), by Nelson Demille - The character Paul Brenner is an Embassy DSS Chief in the Mideast.
2014: State Department Counterintelligence: Leaks, Spies, and Lies (book) by Robert David Booth

Agents as authors
Many former DSS agents have become authors and written works of fiction and non-fiction about their experiences.

The following books were written by DSS Special Agents:
Ghost: Confessions of a Counterterrorism Agent by Fred Burton
Under Fire: The Untold Story of the Attack in Benghazi by Fred Burton and Samuel M. Katz
Beirut Rules: The Murder of a CIA Station Chief and Hezbollah's War Against America by Fred Burton and Samuel M. Katz
Chasing Shadows: A Special Agent's Lifelong Hunt to Bring a Cold War Assassin to Justice by Fred Burton and John Burning
Taking Up the Sword: A Story of a Special Agent in the Diplomatic Security Service by Randall Bennett
For God and Country: Memoirs of a Diplomatic Security Special Agent by Nick Mariano
Agents Unknown: True Stories of Life as a Diplomatic Security Special Agent by Cody J. Perron
State Department Counterintelligence: Leaks, Spies, and Lies by Robert David Booth

The Diplomatic Security Service Wiki
The DSS Wiki has a comprehensive list of DSS pop culture video references with links to video clips.

See also

 Bureau of Diplomatic Security bibliography
 Europol
 Federal Protective Service (FSO), a Russian service that among other security activities provides protection to state visits
 Office of Mobile Security Deployments (MSD), Diplomatic Security Service's tactical unit
 Office of the Inspector General of the Department of State
 Parliamentary and Diplomatic Protection, a British agency providing protection to foreign diplomats and heads of state visiting the UK
 U.S. Border Patrol
 Marine Security Guard
 United States Army Counterintelligence (USACI)

Military Criminal Investigative Organizations
 Air Force Office of Special Investigations (AFOSI or OSI)
 Naval Criminal Investigative Service (NCIS)
 United States Army Criminal Investigation Command (USACIDC or CID)
 Coast Guard Investigative Service (CGIS)

Notes

References

 2001–2009.state.gov
 
 usnews.com

External links

 DSS Facebook Page
 Photos
 Diplomatic Security Wiki

Bureau of Diplomatic Security
Specialist law enforcement agencies of the United States